Tamanrasset, also known as Tamanghasset or Tamenghest, is an oasis city and capital of Tamanrasset Province in southern Algeria, in the Ahaggar Mountains. It is the chief city of the Algerian Tuareg. As of the 2008 census, it has a population of 92,635, up from 72,741 in 1998, with an annual growth rate of 2.5%.

Tamanrasset was originally established as a military outpost to guard the trans-Saharan trade routes. Surrounded by the barren Sahara, very high temperatures of over  have been recorded here. Tamanrasset is located at an oasis where, despite the difficult climate, citrus fruits, apricots, dates, almonds, cereals, corn, and figs are grown. The Tuareg people were once the town's main inhabitants. Tamanrasset is a tourist attraction during the cooler months. Visitors are also drawn to the Museum of the Hoggar, which offers many exhibits depicting Tuareg life and culture.

The city is served by Tamanrasset Airport and the Trans-Sahara Highway.

History
Tamanrasset originated as the centre of a network of camel caravan trading routes from Kano, Lake Chad, Gao, Agades and Zinder. When Algeria was under French rule the town was established as a military post, originally named Fort Laperrine, after General François-Henry Laperrine who died in the desert nearby.

The Catholic priest Charles de Foucauld was shot to death outside his Tamanrasset compound by Sermi ag Thora under the command of El Madani ag Soba on December 1, 1916.

On 13 February 1960, during the Algerian War, Gerboise Bleue – the first French nuclear test – detonated in the middle of the Algerian Sahara, located about 800 km to the north-west of Tamanrasset.

On May 1, 1962, near Ecker, 150 km north of Tamanrasset, there was an accidental venting of a French underground nuclear test. Due to improper sealing of the shaft, a spectacular flame burst through the concrete cap and radioactive gases and dust were vented into the atmosphere. The plume climbed up to 2600 m high and radiation was detected hundreds of kilometres away. About a hundred French soldiers and officials, including two ministers, were irradiated. The number of contaminated Algerians is unknown.

In 2003 Air Algérie Flight 6289 crashed in the city.

In 2010, the oasis town is the site of the Joint Military Staff Committee headquarters for combating Al-Qaeda in Islamic Maghreb. The four-country Committee (Algeria, Mali, Niger, Mauritania) intends to use Tamanrasset to coordinate their military activity in the Pan-Sahel.

A large underwater volcanic eruption on January 15, 2022, in the Pacific island nation of Tonga created a planetary shockwave that circled the Earth at least three times over several days.  The antipode of the pressure wave was in Tamanrasset.  The initial wave reached the city approximately 18 hours after the explosion.

Climate
Tamanrasset has a hot desert climate (Köppen climate classification BWh), with very hot summers (which are moderated by its elevation) and mild winters. There is very little rain throughout the year, although occasional rain does fall in late summer from the northern extension of the Intertropical Convergence Zone.

Education

4.3% of the population has a tertiary education, and another 14.1% has completed secondary education. The overall literacy rate is 69.8%, and is 78.4% among males and 60.8% among females.

Localities 
The commune is composed of 14 localities:

 Tamanrasset
 Amsel
 Outoul
 Tit
 Assekrem
 Tahifet
 Tarhenanet
 Tagmart
 Talan Teidit
 Efak
 Ihelfène
 Tarhaouhaout
 In Dalag
 Izernène

References

External links 

Communes of Tamanrasset Province
Oases of Algeria
Tuareg
Province seats of Algeria
Tamanrasset Province
Cities in Algeria
Algeria